Sir Nigel David Wilson (born 17 November 1956) is a British businessman. He is the group chief executive (Group CEO) of Legal & General, a British multinational financial services company.

Early life
Wilson earned  a degree in economics from the University of Essex and a PhD from the Massachusetts Institute of Technology.

Career
He has been CEO of Legal & General Group since 30 June 2012, having joined as group chief financial officer on 1 September 2009.

He was knighted in the 2022 New Year Honours for services to the finance industry and regional development.

In September 2022, Wilson turned down the position as Minister for Investment in the British government.

Personal life
Wilson has five daughters. He has won several national masters athletics championships.

References

1956 births
Living people
Alumni of the University of Essex
Massachusetts Institute of Technology alumni
British chief executives
British corporate directors
Knights Bachelor